Not Quite Decent is a 1929 American Pre-Code early sound film or part-talkie, produced and distributed by Fox Film Corporation, directed by Irving Cummings, and starring June Collyer and Louise Dresser.

Cast
June Collyer as Linda Cunningham
Louise Dresser as Mame Jarrow
Allan Lane as Jerry Connor
Marjorie Beebe as Margie
Oscar Apfel as Canfield
Ben Hewlett as a Crook
Jack Kenny as Another Crook
Paul Nicholson as Al Bergon

Preservation status
Not Quite Decent is now considered to be a lost film.

See also
List of lost films
1937 Fox vault fire

References

External links

Lobby poster
Poster
Still at silentfilmstillarchive.com

1929 films
Lost American films
Films directed by Irving Cummings
Fox Film films
1929 drama films
American drama films
American black-and-white films
1929 lost films
Lost drama films
1920s English-language films
1920s American films